Two Zero One Seven is a mixtape by American hip hop recording artist Chief Keef. The mixtape was released on January 1, 2017 by Entertainment One Music and RBC Records. Most of the production on the mixtape is handled by Keef himself, with a few tracks by Lex Luger, Young Chop, and Leek-e-Leek. It is Keef's first release since Finally Rollin 2, released in November 2015.

Track listing

References

Chief Keef albums
Self-released albums
2017 mixtape albums